Nursing Science Quarterly is a quarterly peer-reviewed academic journal that publishes papers in the field of nursing. The editor-in-chief is Rosemarie Rizzo Parse (Loyola University Chicago). The journal was established in 1988 and is published by SAGE Publications. Nursing Science Quarterly is devoted exclusively to the enhancement of nursing knowledge. The major purpose of the journal is to publish original manuscripts focusing on nursing theory development, nursing theory–guided practice, and quantitative and qualitative research related to existing nursing frameworks.

External links 
 

SAGE Publishing academic journals
English-language journals
General nursing journals
Quarterly journals
Publications established in 1988